Saaremaa Shipping Company was a company which served the main sea routes between the Estonian mainland and its two major islands, Saaremaa and Hiiumaa. Since 1 October 2016 these routes have been operated by TS Laevad. SLK was declared bankrupt in November 2018.

SLK's three sister ships "Saaremaa", "Hiiumaa" and "Muhumaa" were sold to Elb-Link in Germany. They were sold again in 2018 to service routes in eastern Canada.

See also
Vjatšeslav Leedo, owner of SLK
TS Laevad, company which replaced SLK in 2016
Kihnu Veeteed, operator of eight ferry routes
Ferry class MM 90 FC (in German)

References

External links
Official website
News.postimees.ee. Why state dislikes Leedo’s ferries.

Ferry companies of Estonia
Transport companies established in 1992
Saaremaa
Estonian companies established in 1992